Max T. Bly, Sr. (April 7, 1905 – January 1987) was an American bobsledder who competed in the 1930s. He finished sixth in the four-man event at the 1936 Winter Olympics in Garmisch-Partenkirchen.

References
1936 bobsleigh four-man results
1936 Olympic Winter Games official report. - p. 414.
Max Bly's profile at Sports Reference.com

American male bobsledders
Bobsledders at the 1936 Winter Olympics
1905 births
1987 deaths
Olympic bobsledders of the United States